Amor de barrio (Original title in English: Love from the Hood), is a Mexican telenovela produced by Roberto Hernández for Televisa. It is a remake of the 1979 Mexican telenovela, Muchacha de barrio and Paloma produced in 1975.

The series stars Mane de la Parra as Daniel, Renata Notni as Paloma, Pedro Moreno as Raúl, Alejandra García as Laura, Julieta Rosen as Blanca Estela, Marco Muñoz as Gustavo, Manuel Landeta as Edmundo, Juan Carlos Barreto as Ariel, Lisardo Guarinos as Adalberto and Marisol del Olmo as Catalina.

Plot 
Living and working in the colorful neighborhood, La Lagunilla, two friends, Paloma and Laura, long for respective boyfriends and true love. Paloma, a law student and waitress, falls for Daniel, a wealthy doctor with a manipulative mother and a family filled with secrets. Laura finds love with Daniel's cousin, Raul, a business manager with his own complicated past.

Background and production 
The telenovela premiered on June 8, 2015 at 4:45 p.m., and it aired half-hour-long episodes in the same hour as the telenovela Muchacha italiana viene a casarse, for its first two weeks. Hour long episodes aired in its third week. The program was expected to have 210 episodes. The telenovela was formerly known as "Amores de barrio"; it is a version of the soap operas Muchacha de barrio (1979) and Paloma (1975).

Univision broadcast Amor de barrio On Monday April 11, 2016 weekday afternoons at 2pm/1c replacing an hour of La rosa de Guadalupe. The last episode was broadcast on Friday September 9, 2016 with A que no me dejas replacing it on Monday September 12, 2016.

Production of Amor de barrio officially started on February 23, 2015.

Promotion
The cast and crew of the telenovela were presented for the media at a special screening held at Televisa San Ángel in Mexico City on June 3, 2015. Another presentation at Televisa San Ángel with the cast and live musical performances will stream live for fans on the telenovela's official website on June 4, 2015 at 10:35 p.m.

Cast

Main cast 

Renata Notni as Paloma Madrigal
Mané de la Parra as Daniel Márquez

Also as main cast 

Julieta Rosen as Blanca Estela
Manuel Landeta as Edmundo Vasconcelos
Juan Carlos Barreto as Ariel Lopezreina
Marco Muñoz as Gustavo Mardigal
Alejandra García as Laura Vasconcelos
Pedro Moreno as Raúl Lopezreina
Josh Gutiérrez as Rodrigo
Jessica Coch as Tamara / Mona Lisa Altamirano
Cecilia Toussaint as Dalia
Alejandra Bogue as Kitzia Ariana
Lisardo Guarinos as Adalberto Cruz
Montserrat Marañón as Rosa Arriaga
Paul Stanley as Gabriel Madrigal
Claudette Maillé as Delfina
Gabriela Carrillo as Eugenia Uckerman
Fernanda Arozqueta as Dora Luz
Marisol del Olmo as Catalina Lopezreina

Supporting cast 
Marcela Moret as Mirtha
Andrés Almeida as Paúl Dumont
Gilberto de Anda as Claudio Ukerman
Moisés Suárez as Hermes
Carlos Speitzer as Josh
Alex Perla as Tico

Special participation 
Queta Lavat as Zelma
Alexander Holtmann as Walter

Mexico broadcast

References

External links 

Televisa telenovelas
Mexican telenovelas
2015 telenovelas
2015 Mexican television series debuts
2015 Mexican television series endings
Spanish-language telenovelas